The following is the electoral history of Richard M. Daley, an American politician who served as mayor of Chicago, Cook County State's Attorney, and Illinois state senator.

Daley was the longest-serving mayor of Chicago, serving 22 years with five full terms, plus a partial term.

Daley began his electoral political career being elected to serve as a delegate to the 
1969–1970 Illinois constitutional convention.

Member of the 1969–70 Illinois Constitutional Convention

Illinois state senator

1972

1976

1978

Cook County State's Attorney

1980

1984

1988

Mayor of Chicago

1983

1989 special

1991

1995

1999

2003

2007

References

Richard M. Daley
Daley, Richard M.